The Wiper Democratic Movement–Kenya (WDM-K), formally Orange Democratic Movement–Kenya (ODM–Kenya), is a political party in Kenya, which originated as a result of the 2005 Kenyan constitutional referendum. It is headed by Kalonzo Musyoka, who ran for president in 2007 and served as the vice-president in the Grand Coalition of Mwai Kibaki and Raila Odinga. He is now a member of the main opposition NASA.

2007 elections

The present Wiper Democratic Movement, originally known as ODM-Kenya was created as a result a split between Kalonzo Musyoka and Raila Odinga in mid-August 2007. Raila's group, which also included Musalia Mudavadi, William Ruto, Joseph Nyagah and Najib Balala bought out the original ODM party from Mugambi Imanyara, while Kalonzo's group, consisting of himself and Dr. Julia Ojiambo remained in the shell of the party. The two factions held their elections for presidential candidate on consecutive days at the Kasarani sports complex in Nairobi. On 31 August 2007, Kalonzo Musyoka defeated Julia Ojiambo for the ODM–Kenya ticket. On September 1 Raila Odinga was selected the ODM presidential candidate. Raila and Kalonzo faced president Kibaki in the general election. Kalonzo took a distant third place, but in January 2008 he became vice-president of Kenya under Kibaki, whose victory was disputed by Raila Odinga and the ODM.
Following the 2007-2008 Kenyan crisis, which resulted in a great loss of life, a government of national unity was formed between Kibaki's PNU and Odinga's ODM, with Musyoka retaining his position as vice-president. So far, Musyoka is one of two Wiper Democratic Movement politicians in the cabinet, with Mutula Kilonzo as Minister for Justice and Constitutional Affairs, as his faction received very little support in the parliamentary election.

Political Parties Act
In December 2008 Wiper Democratic Movement held party elections to comply with the recently passed Political Parties Act.

2013 General Elections
In mid-2011 the party changed its colours and symbol in order to differentiate itself from Raila Odinga's ODM party and was believed to be a central cog in a proposed political alliance intended to present a unified front against Raila in the 2013 general elections.
However, in December 2012 it became one of three political parties, the others being FORD-Kenya & Orange Democratic Movement to support Odinga's soon-to-be-doomed presidential ambitions.

2017 General Elections
Wiper Democratic Movement entered in a Coalition with ODM, ANC Kenya and Ford Kenya to Form the National Super Alliance in the run up to 2017 presidential elections.

Like in 2013, the party was awarded the Deputy President ticket of what is Raila Odinga 's last participation in Kenya presidential election. The coalition lost to jubilee party in the August 8, 2017 election and successfully petitioned the Supreme Court to annul the results.

The party supported the boycott in the repeat Presidential election on October 26, 2017, held during what is the incumbent President Uhuru Kenyatta's birthday.

The boycott saw over 12 million voters refusing to vote in what the opposition termed as prerigged election.

Wiper party leader refused to show up on January 30 for the swearing in ceremony for the People’s President Raila Odinga, a move that has left the party fighting for acceptance by its supporters who availed in numbers on that fateful day.

References

  6. KTN Prime: Machakos Governor Alfred Mutua drops Wiper leader Kalonzo's illegal land deal in Mavoko
  7. Rivals crank up gears in race for Machakos County top seat
  8. Taita Taveta woman rep race is wide open
  9. Wavinya survives again after appeal court dismisses case

External links
2007 Manifesto
2007 Parliamentary Candidates

Political parties established in 2006
Political parties in Kenya